Gian Franco Anedda (28 August 1930 – 17 July 2020) was an Italian politician.

Anedda was born in Cagliari on 28 August 1930. He studied and practiced law before his election to the Cagliari municipal council and the Regional Council of Sardinia. Anedda began his political career affiliated with the Italian Social Movement, and later joined its successor, the National Alliance. Anedda won election to the Chamber of Deputies for the first time in 1992, and served through 2006. Between 1994 and 1995, Anedda served as undersecretary of the Ministry of Justice. He was elected a lay member of the High Council of the Judiciary in 2005. Anedda died on 17 July 2020.

References

20th-century Italian lawyers
Italian city councillors
Members of the Regional Council of Sardinia
Deputies of Legislature XI of Italy
Deputies of Legislature XII of Italy
Deputies of Legislature XIII of Italy
Deputies of Legislature XIV of Italy
National Alliance (Italy) politicians
Italian Social Movement politicians
1930 births
2020 deaths
People from Cagliari